Daniel Francis Anyembe (born 22 July 1998) is a Danish professional footballer who plays as a right-back for Danish Superliga club Viborg FF.

Club career

Esbjerg fB
Anyembe was born in Esbjerg, and started playing football for Esbjerg IF 92. In 2009, he joined partner club Esbjerg fB where he progressed through their youth academy.

On 20 September 2016, Esbjerg fB confirmed, that they had extended Anyembe's contract one year until 2018. He would continue to play for their under-19 squad.

Anyembe made his debut for Esbjerg on 8 November 2016 against Middelfart in the Danish Cup, a match which Esbjerg won 1–0. He played his first match in the Danish Superliga on 4 December 2016 against Brøndby IF, which ended in a 1–1 draw. He came on the pitch in the 46th minute, where he replaced Andreas Nordvik. Anyembe signed a three-year contract extension on 1 June 2017 until 2020.

He was promoted to the first team squad for the 2017–18 season in the Danish 1st Division. Anyembe signed another contract extension in August 2018, keeping him a part of the club until 2022. Following promotion back to the Danish Superliga, Anyembe played more regularly as Esbjerg managed to qualify for European football by finishing third.

Anyembe made his European debut on 25 July 2019 in the second qualifying round of the UEFA Europa League, as Esbjerg lost 2–0 away at Stroitel Stadium to Belarusian club Shakhtyor Soligorsk. He was a starter through most of the season, until suffering a knee injury in January 2020 which sidelined him for the remainder of the season as Esbjerg suffered another relegation to the 1st Division.

Viborg
On 17 July 2021, Anyembe joined newly promoted Danish Superliga club Viborg on a deal until 30 June 2025. He made his debut on 25 July in a 1–1 draw against defending champions Brøndby, coming on as a substitute in the 78th minute for Frans Putros.

International career
Anyembe has both the opportunity to play for Denmark and Kenya.

Career statistics

References

External links
 
 

1998 births
Living people
Danish men's footballers
Association football defenders
Danish Superliga players
Danish 1st Division players
Esbjerg fB players
Viborg FF players
Denmark youth international footballers
People from Esbjerg
Danish people of Kenyan descent
Sportspeople from the Region of Southern Denmark